Ruth Oma Mackintosh Wilkinson (born 1918), better known as Roma Wilkinson, was an American songwriter whose compositions were performed by such singers as Bing Crosby and the Andrew Sisters.

Biography
Wilkinson was born in Kansas City, Missouri in 1918, the fourth of nine children.  Her mother ran a general store and encouraged Roma’s creative streak by offering customized poems and cards for her customers, which Roma would write. Wilkinson started writing songs when she was very young.  The Gods Were Angry With Me, a song she wrote at the age of 16, later became a hit for country singer Jim Reeves, who included it on several of his albums. Several of her songs were recorded by other people, including Bing Crosby and Peggy Lee.  Always a lyricist, she often partnered with musician Watt Watkins to create their music. Wilkinson also wrote music, and submitted some demos with her own melodies.

References

External links
 AllMusic page

1918 births
Possibly living people
Songwriters from Missouri